Glomb is a surname. It is derived from the Polish noun "głąb". Notable people with the surname include:

 Daniel Glomb (born 1980), Brazilian sailor
 Diana Glomb (born 1947), American politician and social worker
 Günther Glomb (1930–2015), German football manager
 Theresa Glomb, American academic

See also

References

Polish-language surnames